Silwan or Siloam is a predominantly Palestinian neighborhood in East Jerusalem, on the outskirts of the Old City of Jerusalem.

It is mentioned in the Hebrew Bible and the New Testament; in the latter it is the location of Jesus' healing the man blind from birth. Medieval Silwan began as a farming village, dating back to the 7th century according to local traditions, while the earliest mention of the village is from the year 985. From the 19th century onwards, the village was slowly being incorporated into Jerusalem until it became an urban neighborhood.

After the 1948 war, the village came under Jordanian rule. Jordanian rule lasted until the 1967 Six-Day War, since which it has been occupied by Israel. Silwan is administered as part of the Jerusalem Municipality.

In 1980, Israel incorporated East Jerusalem (of which Silwan is a part) into its claimed capital city Jerusalem through the Jerusalem Law, a basic law in Israel. The move is considered by the international community as illegal under international law, but the Israeli government disputes this. According to  Haaretz, the Israeli government has worked closely with the right-wing settler organization Ateret Cohanim to evict Palestinians living on property whether classified formerly as heqdesh (property pledged to a temple) or not, especially in the Batan el-Hawa area of Silwan.

Depending on how the neighborhood is defined, the Palestinian residents in Silwan number 20,000 to 50,000 while there are about 500 to 2,800 Jews.

Geography

Silwan is located southwest of the Old City Walls and constitutes part of the Jerusalem's "Holy Basin". The neighborhood has a narrow shape on a north-to-south axis. It is bounded by  Wadi Hilweh and Abu Tor to the west and the Ras al-Amud neighborhood to east. Its southern tip touches the Jabel Mukaber neighborhood and its northern tip touches the Mount of Olives Jewish Cemetery.

The historical core of the village is in its northwestern section, considered to be the site of ancient Jerusalem. This location is where dozens of ancient burial tombs attributed to the time of ancient Israel and Judah as well as the Byzantine rule were found. The modern villagers used the tombs as dwellings or as enclosures for livestock. Many of the burial tombs are inhabited until today. The village was built next to numerous water sources of historical importance, such as the Pool of Siloam (Ain Silwan), Gihon Spring and Ein Rogel. The rest of the village was built in the 19th century.

History

Iron Age

In the ancient period, the area where the village stands was occupied by the necropolis of the Biblical kingdom. In the valley below, according to the Hebrew Bible, "the waters of Shiloah go softly" (from the Gihon Spring) and "the Pool of Siloam" to water what since King Solomon became known as the king's garden.

The necropolis, or ancient cemetery, is an archaeological site of major significance. It contains fifty rock-cut tombs of distinguished calibre, assumed to be the burial places of the highest-ranking officials of the Judean kingdom. Tomb inscriptions are in Hebrew. The "most famous" of the ancient rock-cut tombs in Silwan is finely carved, the one known as the Tomb of Pharaoh's daughter. Another notable tomb, called the Tomb of the Royal Steward is now incorporated into a modern-period house. The ancient inscription informs us that it is the final resting place of ""...yahu who is over the house." The first part of the Hebrew name is effaced, but it refers to a Judean royal steward or chamberlain. It is now in the collection of the British Museum.

At their first thorough archaeological investigation, all of the tombs were long since emptied, and their contents removed. A great deal of destruction was done to the tombs over the centuries by Roman-period quarrying and later by their conversion for use as housing, both by monks in the Byzantine period, when some were used as churches, and later by Muslim villagers "...when the Arab village was built; tombs were destroyed, incorporated in houses or turned into water cisterns and sewage dumps."

According to the Hebrew Bible, Siloam was built around the "serpent-stone", Zoheleth, where Adonijah gave his feast in the time of Solomon.

The Siloam inscription was discovered in the water tunnel built during the reign of Hezekiah, in the early 7th century BC. The Siloam inscription is now preserved in the Archeological Museum of Istanbul, Turkey. Another important inscription found at Siloam is the lintel of Shebna-yahu's tomb (known as the Shebna Inscription), which is in the collections of the British Museum. In 2004, archaeologists excavating the site for the Israel Antiquities Authority found biblical-era coins marked with ancient Hebrew writing, pottery shards and a stone bottle cork that confirmed the identification of the site as the biblical Siloam Pool.

Roman period
The King's Garden was used as a staging area for Jewish pilgrims who, during the festivals of Passover, Shavuot and Sukkot, used the spring-fed Pool of Siloam to wash and ritually purify themselves before ascending the monumental stepped street to the Temple Mount while singing hymns based on Psalms. On Sukkot water was brought from the Pool of Siloam to the Temple and poured upon the altar and the priests also drank of this water.

In the New Testament, the collapse of the Tower of Siloam is cited by Jesus as one of two examples where sudden, untimely death came to people who didn't necessarily deserve it more than most other sinful people.

According to the Gospel of John, Jesus healed a man who had been blind from birth. Jesus spat on the ground, made mud with the saliva, and spread the mud over the blind man's eyes. He then told the man, "Go wash yourself in the Pool of Siloam." So the man went and washed and came back seeing.

Josephus described the waters of Siloam as "sweet and abundant". During the general outbreak of hostilities between the Jewish nation and the Roman Imperial army in ca. 66 CE, Simon bar Giora controlled all of the "Upper City" where he made his place of residence in the Phasael tower before abandoning it, and part of the "Lower City" (Acra) as far as the great wall in the Kidron Valley and the fountain of Siloam, now in Silwan.

Byzantine period
A pool and church were built at Siloam by the Byzantine empress Eudocia (c. 400–460 CE) to commemorate Jesus' miraculous healing of the blind.

Early Muslim period

Local folklore dates Silwan to the arrival of the second Rashidun caliph, Umar ibn al-Khattab from Arabia. According to one resident's version of the story, the Greeks were so impressed that the Caliph entered on foot while his servant rode on a camel that they presented him with the key to the city. The Caliph thereafter granted the wadi to "Khan Silowna," an agricultural community of cave dwellers living in ancient rock-cut tombs along the face of the eastern ridge.

In medieval Muslim tradition, the spring of Silwan (Ayn Silwan) was among the four most sacred water sources in the world. The others were Zamzam in Mecca, Ayn Falus in Beisan and Ayn al-Baqar in Acre. Silwan is mentioned as "Sulwan" by the 10th-century Arab writer and traveller al-Muqaddasi. In his 985 book he noted that (as rendered in the edition by Le Strange) "The village of Sulwan is a place on the outskirts of the city [Jerusalem]. Below the village of 'Ain Sulwan (Spring of Siloam), of fairly good water, which irrigates the large gardens which were given in bequest (Waqf) by the Khalif 'Othman ibn 'Affan for the poor of the city. Lower down than this, again, is Job's Well (Bir Ayyub). It is said that on the Night of 'Arafat the water of  the holy well Zamzam, at Makkah, comes underground to the water of the Spring (of Siloam). The people hold a festival here on that evening."

Moshe Gil interprets statements by Muqaddasi (writing in 985), Nasir-i Khusraw (1047), and Yaqut (1225), as meaning that what they called the Spring of Silwan can only be a water source located at quite a distance farther south, Khusraw actually indicating a distance of c. 3 km from Jerusalem's walls. This leads to Gil identifying this "Spring of Silwan" with what we know today as the Spring of Bir Ayyub (biblical Ein Rogel), whose exact location in those days cannot be pinpointed anymore, but was in any case several km away from the city walls.

Ottoman period

In 1596, Ayn Silwan appeared in Ottoman tax registers as being in the Nahiya of Quds of the Liwa of Quds, with a population of 60 households, all Muslim. They paid a total of 35,500 akçe in taxes, and all of the revenues went to a Waqf.

In 1834, during a large-scale peasants' rebellion against Ibrahim Pasha, thousands of rebels infiltrated Jerusalem through ancient underground sewage channels leading to the farm fields of the village of Silwan. A traveller to Palestine in 1883, T. Skinner, wrote that the olive groves near Silwan were a gathering place for Muslims on Fridays.

In 1838 Silwan was noted as a Muslim village, part of el-Wadiyeh district, located east of Jerusalem.

A photograph of the village taken between 1853 and 1857 by James Graham can be found on page 35 of Picturing Jerusalem by photographers James Graham and Mendel Diness. It shows the western part of the modern village as empty of habitations, a few trees are scattered across the southern ridge with the small village confined to the ridgetop east of the valley.

The National-Religious Jewish settlers' organisation, ElAd, was accused of excavating on Palestinian property and beginning its work on the City of David tunnels before receiving a permit from the Jerusalem Municipality.

The general area was thought by many historical geographers to be that of Josephus' Acra, so-named after an old fortress that was once there, an area also called the "Lower City."

In 2007, archaeologists unearthed under a parking lot a 2,000-year-old mansion that may have belonged to Queen Helene of Adiabene. The building includes storerooms, living quarters and ritual baths.
In 2008, Islamic-era skeletons discovered in the course of excavations have disappeared.

References

Bibliography

 

 
 

  
 

 (reprint)

External links
Ancient Silwan (Shiloah) Siloam in Israel and The City of David
Survey of Western Palestine, Map 17:    IAA, Wikimedia commons
Silwan & Ath Thuri (Fact Sheet) Applied Research Institute–Jerusalem, ARIJ
Aerial photo, ARIJ
Silwan (Shiloah) in Antiquity Archaeological Survey of Israel
East Jerusalem: 'Every action in this area is very sensitive' – video, The Guardian
East Jerusalem: Witnessing the truth – video, The Guardian
Home Demolition and Forced Displacement in Silwan, The Civic Coalition for Palestinian Rights in Jerusalem
A City Divided: Jerusalem's Most Contested Neighborhood, Vice News
Overview of the Yemenite Village Adjacent to the Gihon Spring, by Ateret Cohanim
 Wadi Hilweh Information Center

Arab neighborhoods in Jerusalem
 
Mausoleums used as housing
Archaeological sites in Jerusalem
Historic Jewish communities
Ancient Israel and Judah
Ancient sites in Jerusalem